Nether Wasdale is a village in Cumbria, England, located in the Wasdale valley, near the River Irt and just over a mile to the west of the Wastwater lake.

Notable features

The main church in Nether Wasdale is St Michaels and All Angels Church, which was built in the 16th century. The church has a maypole in front of it: now a listed structure, it was built originally to celebrate Queen Victoria's diamond jubilee. The nearby Wastwater is, at 258' deep the deepest of all of the Lake District lakes. Nether Wasdale is served by the ancient Bridle Path "Guards Lonning" that runs from Lane Side east of Gosforth along to Guards Head, between Blengdale Forest and the newly planted Bamse's Wood, across a wooden footbridge at Kid Beck and down between Yew Tree Farm and Windsor Farm into Nether Wasdale.

Nether Wasdale contains the hotels the Screes Inn, the Strands Hotel and Low Wood Hall.

See also

Listed buildings in Wasdale

References

External links
 Cumbria County History Trust: Nether Wasdale (nb: provisional research only – see Talk page)

Villages in Cumbria
Borough of Copeland